Eigra Lewis Roberts (born 7 August 1939) is a Welsh-language author of about 30 plays, short stories, children's books and novels. She has won several awards at the National Eisteddfod of Wales.

Personal life
Born in Blaenau Ffestiniog, Roberts attended Ffestiniog County School, along with her fellow author John Rowlands and the poet Gwyn Thomas. Having graduated from University College of North Wales in Bangor, she taught in Holyhead and Llanrwst and now lives in Dolwyddelan. Roberts has an honorary MA from the University of Wales.

Career
Aged 20, Roberts won the open novel prize at the 1959 Caernarfon National Eisteddfod of Wales. In the 1960s and 1970s she was known for writing about the lives and dissatisfaction of Welsh women in Post-war Britain, a topic little covered Welsh authors at the time. In the 1980s, she was the screenwriter adapting her novel Mis o Fehefin for the Welsh television programme Minafon.

In 2006, Roberts wrote her first novel in English, the semi-autobiographical Return Ticket. That year she won the Crown in the Swansea National Eisteddfod for a collection of poems about Sylvia Plath. In 2013, her work  was shortlisted for the Wales Book of the Year award.

Selected works
Brynhyfryd, 1959
Mis o Fehefin, 1980
Return Ticket, 2006 (Gomer Press)
Parlwr Bach, 2013

References

1939 births
Living people
Alumni of Bangor University
Welsh writers
Welsh novelists
People from Blaenau Ffestiniog